is a Japanese ultramarathon runner from Hokkaido. Inagaki holds current women's world record in 24-hour run Indoor (Espoo FIN, Jan 2011), and in 48-hour run Track (Surgeres FRA, May 2010). She is a two time female winner of IAU 24-Hour Run World Championship. She was the female winner of 2006 and 2009 Spartathlon, and the female winner of 2011 and 2012 Badwater Ultramarathon.

Competition record

International competitions

Non-championship races
2014
1st place in 24-hour run Finland (240.6 km) 
1st place in 48-hour run France (397.1 km) 
2013
1st place in 24-hour run Finland (220.7 km) 
1st place in 48-hour run Sweden (331 km)
2012
1st place in 24-hour run Finland (228.173 km)
1st place among women (11th in general) in Badwater Ultramarathon (29:53:9)
3rd place among women in Soochow International Ultramarathon (221.555 km)
2011
1st place in 24-hour Indoor run Finland, setting the world record of 240.631 km
1st place among women (9th in general) in Badwater Ultramarathon (28:49:27)
2010
1st place in 24-hour run Finland
1st place in 48-hour Track run World Championship, setting a new world record of 397.103 km
2009
1st place in 48-hour run World Championship, setting a new world record of 382.718 km
2006
1st place in 24-hour run World Championship
1st place in 48-hour run World Championship, setting the world record of 382.418 km

Personal life
After graduating from college, Inagaki worked at a kindergarten. She eventually started taking yoga lessons, and now she is an aerobics and yoga instructor.

Inagaki states that ultramarathon is not her job, but what she loves to do, where she finds the joy of life. "What I do is a fun run. I train as if I were having a picnic."

References

1966 births
Living people
Japanese ultramarathon runners
Japanese female long-distance runners
Japanese female marathon runners
Sportspeople from Hokkaido
Female ultramarathon runners